The 131 Squadron of the Israeli Air Force, also known as the Yellow Bird Squadron, is a C-130E and KC-130H squadron based at Nevatim Airbase.

References

Israeli Air Force squadrons